Frank Hartley (born December 15, 1967 in Chicago, Illinois) is a former professional American football player who played tight end for five seasons for the Cleveland Browns, Baltimore Ravens, and San Diego Chargers.

1967 births
Living people
Cleveland Browns players
Baltimore Ravens players
San Diego Chargers players
Illinois Fighting Illini football players
Players of American football from Chicago